Hany Abdel Gawad El-Banna OBE (born 9 December 1950) is the co-founder of Islamic Relief, the largest Western-based international Muslim relief and development NGO, established in 1984 in Birmingham, UK.

Education and Islamic Relief 
Born in Egypt, El-Banna completed his MBBCh Medicine at Al Azhar University, Cairo, where he also obtained a Diploma in Islamic Studies in 1976. El-Banna was awarded the Hamilton Bailey Prize in Medicine at City hospital (previously known as Dudley Road) in 1981, Birmingham UK. He then went on to further his medical training and completed a Doctorate of Medicine (MD) in foetal pathology from the University of Birmingham Medical School in 1991. A pathologist by education, El-Banna attended a medical conference in Sudan in 1983 during a time of famine in the region. The poverty and desperation he witnessed compelled him to return to the UK and set up Islamic Relief as an organisation to help people in need.

Muslim Charities Forum and Zakat House 

Since leaving Islamic Relief in 2008, El-Banna founded the Muslim Charities Forum (MCF), of which he is chairman and The Humanitarian Forum where he is President of the board of trustees. The Humanitarian Forum seeks to foster partnerships and closer co-operation among the humanitarian and charitable organisations from Muslim countries and their Western counterparts. More recently he founded the International HIV Fund, an organisation to build and improve networks of HIV organisations and Zakat House, a social enterprise helping new and growing charities. El-Banna has visited over 60 countries on behalf of these organisations.

El-Banna is also a Chairman of Muslim Charities Forum (MCF) a registered charity that aims to improve British Muslim charities' contribution to international development by promoting the exchange of experience, ideas and information amongst the members, between networks of NGOs in the UK and internationally, with the Governments, and other bodies with the interest in international development.

The organisation has been the subject of controversy in the United Kingdom. It was stripped of £250,000 in funding from the British government for its alleged ties to extremist organisations, and has been described in the British media as "an umbrella group for a number of leading Islamic charities, some of which allegedly have links to the Muslim Brotherhood, Hamas and other terrorist organisations."

Some of its members are also members of the Union of Good, an umbrella organisation consisting of over 50 Islamic charities and funds.  It has also been named a Specially Designated Global Terrorist by the US Department of the Treasury.

According to The Guardian, MCF and its members “fiercely deny any links to terrorism."

In 2014, the Charity Commission announced a change in policy to allow the public naming of charities which were under investigation by the regulator. The announcement was met with concerns of damaging the reputations of charities before any conclusions were reached. Speaking on behalf of the Muslim Charities Forum, El-Banna stated that they welcomed further scrutiny and transparency, whilst also warning of the possible alternative outcomes, writing: We call for the immediate repeal of this policy. This could damage the reputation of charities that have not committed any wrongdoing, bringing their activities under intense media scrutiny and creating public uncertainty before due process. We are also concerned that disclosing an investigation may damage relationships with donors and partners critical to our work for our beneficiaries in the UK and around the world.

Awards 
El-Banna was appointed an Officer of the Order of the British Empire (OBE) by Queen Elizabeth II in the 2004 New Year Honours; in the same year he received Ibn Khaldun Award for Excellence in Promoting Understanding between Global Cultures and Faiths within the UK. It was also in 2004 that the Egyptian Medical Syndicate awarded him for his services to humanity and medicine. In 2005 he received the Kashmiri and Pakistani Professional Association Award and in 2006 he was awarded the Asian Jewel Lifetime Achievement Award. Acknowledging his worldwide work and influence in 2007, the UK Muslim Power 100 awarded him with their lifetime achievement award and the University of Birmingham has awarded him an honorary doctorate.

In January 2013, he was nominated for the Muslim in the Community award at the British Muslim Awards.

Centre for Interfaith Action on Global Poverty 
He was a Founding Partner and Board of Trustees member and President of the Centre for Interfaith Action on Global Poverty (CIFA)  but  no longer appears to be associated with CIFA.

References

External links
 Dr Hany El Banna at the Center for Interfaith Action
 Humanitarian Forum Trustees: Dr Hany El Banna
 Mosaic: Dr Hany El Banna OBE
 
 
 
 
 
 
 

1950 births
Living people
Egyptian emigrants to the United Kingdom
English Muslims
Al-Azhar University alumni
Alumni of the University of Birmingham
Officers of the Order of the British Empire
Naturalised citizens of the United Kingdom